Bayley Island is one of the West Wellesley Islands, on the eastern side of the Gulf of Carpentaria, Queensland, Australia. It is within the Shire of Mornington.

Geography 

Bayley Point lies opposite the island on the mainland.

References

Islands of Queensland